Simon Case  (born 27 December 1978) is a British civil servant who is the current Cabinet Secretary and Head of the Home Civil Service since 9 September 2020, succeeding Sir Mark Sedwill.

Case was Downing Street Permanent Secretary to Prime Minister Boris Johnson from May to September 2020. That role had been vacant for eight years after Sir Jeremy Heywood left in 2012. From January 2016 to May 2017, Case served under David Cameron and Theresa May as Principal Private Secretary to the Prime Minister of the United Kingdom.

Early life and education
Case was born on 27 December 1978 in Bristol, England. He was educated at Bristol Grammar School and Trinity College, Cambridge, graduating with a Bachelor of Arts (BA) degree in History. While at Cambridge, he rowed and was President of Cambridge University Lightweight Rowing Club. He then undertook postgraduate research in political history and studied at Queen Mary University of London and was awarded Doctor of Philosophy (PhD) degree from University of London in 2007. His doctoral supervisor was Professor Peter Hennessy, and his thesis was entitled The Joint Intelligence Committee and the German Question, 1947–61.

Career
Case joined the Civil Service in 2006. He worked first within the Ministry of Defence as a policy adviser. He then worked in the Northern Ireland Office and the Cabinet Office. In 2012, he served as Head of the Olympic Secretariat, a temporary team within the Cabinet Office that was set up to oversee the delivery of the 2012 Summer Olympics.

From 2012 and July 2014, Case worked at 10 Downing Street as a Private Secretary to the Prime Minister and then as Deputy Principal Private Secretary to the Prime Minister. He then returned to the Cabinet Office, where he was Executive Director of the Implementation Group. In March 2015, he joined Government Communications Headquarters (GCHQ) as Director of Strategy.

On 8 January 2016, Case was announced as the next Principal Private Secretary to the Prime Minister in succession to Chris Martin who had died while in office. He took up the appointment on 11 January 2016.

In March 2017, Case was announced as the Director General for the UK–EU Partnership, being succeeded by Peter Hill as Principal Private Secretary to the Prime Minister on 10 May 2017. He took up the post in May 2017. In this role he was "leading the UK Government's work on exiting and seeking a new partnership with the European Union within the UK Representation to the EU". On 23 June 2017, he was appointed a Commander of the Royal Victorian Order (CVO) in recognition of his service as Principal Private Secretary to the Prime Minister.

In January 2018, he was appointed Director General Northern Ireland and Ireland: in this role, he acted as the lead civil servant for finding a solution to the Irish border issue post-Brexit.

In March 2018, it was announced that Case would be the next Private Secretary to Prince William, Duke of Cambridge; he took up the appointment in July 2018. Also in 2018, Case was appointed a Visiting Professor at King's College London, having previously been a Visiting Senior Research Fellow at the university.

Head of the Home Civil Service and Cabinet Secretary
In August 2020 Case was chosen by Prime Minister Boris Johnson as Cabinet Secretary and Head of the Home Civil Service, succeeding Mark Sedwill on 9 September 2020, the youngest Cabinet Secretary to date.

In April 2021, in light of the Greensill scandal, Case ordered all civil servants to declare paid roles or outside interests that "might conflict" with Civil Service rules after it emerged that a senior official had joined a firm while still a civil servant.

On 15 June 2021, Case and Prime Minister Johnson jointly signed a Declaration on Government Reform intended to improve the way government operates in the UK.

In December 2021, the Prime Minister appointed Case to lead an inquiry into the Westminster Christmas parties controversy, where government departments had been alleged to have carried out social gatherings in late 2020 in contravention of COVID-19 regulations. Just over a week later, on 17 December 2021, it was announced that he was to recuse himself from the inquiry because of reports that a party had been held in his private office. The next day, on 18 December 2021, Case officially resigned from the inquiry position. His role in the inquiry was taken over by the civil servant Sue Gray.

In a letter to civil servants in May 2022, Case said that up to 91,000 civil servants would lose their jobs to return it to 2016 levels, which would be the biggest decrease in staff since World War Two. Case said civil service staffing had grown "substantially" since 2016, partly because of the pandemic. "We must consider how we can streamline our workforce and equip ourselves with the skills we need to be an even more effective, lean and innovative service that continues to deliver for the people we serve," he wrote.

On 8 September 2022, Case informed then-Prime Minister Liz Truss that Queen Elizabeth II had died.

On 13 September 2022, Case was sworn-in as a member of the Privy Council.

Westminster COVID-19 pandemic controversies

Gatherings 
Case was the highest ranking public official to be implicated in the 'partygate' scandal; however, he stated he would not resign. Junior colleagues were reportedly furious that Case did not have to pay a penalty for the parties, despite having to recuse himself from investigating them.

Lockdown Files 
In early March 2023, The Daily Telegraph published a number of WhatsApp messages from the UK's COVID-19 Lockdown period. Case, who was said to be in discussion with the then-Health Secretary Matt Hancock, reportedly mocked holidaymakers stuck in hotel rooms by the UK's quarantine policy, saying it was "hilarious" and how he wanted to "see some of the faces of people coming out of first class and into a Premier Inn shoe box". In some messages Case said how some opposition to Covid restrictions were “pure Conservative ideology”.

Case, described Johnson as “nationally distrusted figure” and warned the public were unlikely to follow isolation rules laid down by him.

Personal life
In 2007, Case married Elizabeth Kistruck, chief finance officer for Hotels.com at Expedia Inc. They have three daughters.

References

 

1978 births
Living people
People educated at Bristol Grammar School
Alumni of Trinity College, Cambridge
Alumni of the University of London
Alumni of Queen Mary University of London
British civil servants
Civil servants in the Cabinet Office
GCHQ people
Principal Private Secretaries to the Prime Minister
Place of birth missing (living people)
Civil servants from Bristol
Commanders of the Royal Victorian Order
Members of the British Royal Household
Members of the Privy Council of the United Kingdom